Jean Crépin (1 September 1908 – 4 May 1996) was a French Army officer during World War II, the First Indochina War and the Algerian War. A lifelong Gaullist, he played a decisive role in many conflicts of the 20th century. He is also credited for being the driving force behind the development of the Exocet missiles and other weaponry.
After his retirement from the army in 1967 he became CEO of a aerospace manufacturer Nord Aviation. In 1970 he was Vice president of SNIAS (later Aérospatiale) and president of Euromissile. Crépin died in May 1996.

See also
 Lists of Légion d'honneur recipients
 List of Companions of the Liberation

References

External links

1908 births
1996 deaths
French Army officers
French generals
Recipients of the Cross for Military Valour
Companions of the Liberation
Grand Croix of the Légion d'honneur
French Resistance members
French military personnel of World War II
French military personnel of the First Indochina War
French military personnel of the Algerian War
École Polytechnique alumni